El Clásico Chapin (English: The Classic Chapin), also known as the Guatemalan Derbi, El Clasico, El SuperClásico or El Juego De Juegos (Spanish language) is a football match between rivals C.S.D. Comunicaciones and C.S.D. Municipal. The rivalry comes about as Comunicaciones and Municipal are the two biggest teams in Guatemala, whilst the clubs are the most successful and influential football clubs in the country.

See also
List of football (soccer) rivalries
Major football rivalries
Sports rivalry
Nationalism and sport
C.S.D. Comunicaciones
C.S.D. Municipal
Estadio Mateo Flores

Football in Guatemala